Maliya Miyana Junction railway station is a railway station in Maliya of Morbi district in Gujarat. It belongs to the Western Railway of  Division.

History

Maliya Miyana–Wankaner section is a road-side tram way laid down in 1880 by Morvi State Railway. The last steam-engine hauled section in India, it was subsequently converted to broad gauge, the work being completed in 2001.

Major trains

Following trains halt at Maliya Miyana Junction railway station in both direction:

 22955/56 Kutch Express
 18501/02 Visakhapatnam–Gandhidham Express
 19115/16 Sayajinagari Express
 14311/12 Ala Hazrat Express (via Ahmedabad)
 16335/36 Gandhidham–Nagercoil Express
 15667/68 Kamakhya–Gandhidham Express
 22951/52 Bandra Terminus–Gandhidham Weekly Superfast Express

Maliya Miyana–Morbi DEMU train starts from here.

References

Railway stations in Rajkot district
Ahmedabad railway division
Railway junction stations in Gujarat